Within the health system, the Classification of Chinese hospitals is a 3-tier system according to the Ministry of Health of the People's Republic of China. Hospitals in China have been classified since at least 2008 in a system that recognizes a hospital's ability to provide medical care, medical education, and conduct medical research. Hospitals are designated as Primary, Secondary or Tertiary hospitals.
A primary hospital is typically a township hospital that contains less than 100 beds. They are tasked with providing preventive care, minimal health care and rehabilitation services. A primary hospital is similar to Community hospitals in the West.
A secondary hospital is one that tend to be affiliated with a medium size city, county or district and contain more than 100 beds, but less than 500. They are responsible for providing comprehensive health services, as well as medical education and conducting research on a regional basis.  A secondary hospital is similar to a Regional hospital or District hospital in the West.  
A tertiary hospital is a comprehensive, referral, general hospitals at the city, provincial or national level with a bed capacity exceeding 500. They are responsible for providing specialist health services, perform a bigger role with regard to medical education and scientific research and they serve as medical hubs providing care to multiple regions.  The tertiary hospital is similar to a Tertiary referral hospital in the West.

Further, based on the level of service provision, size, medical technology, medical equipment, and management and medical quality, these 3 grades are further subdivided into 3 subsidiary levels: A, B and C (甲[jiǎ], 乙[yǐ], 丙[bǐng]). This results in a total of 9 levels. In addition, one special level – 3AAA (三级特等) –is reserved for the most specialized hospitals, though no hospitals have yet been placed in this level.  This system is hence referred to in Chinese as 三级十等 (sānjí shíděng), 3 Grades and 10 levels.

In 2015, the Ministry of Health's National Health and Family Planning Commission, used the terms community hospital and top level hospital in describing hospital planning.

See also 
Medicine in China
List of hospitals in China
Public hospital#China

References 

Hospitals in China
Medical classification
Types of health care facilities